Gorka is a rural locality (a village) in Nizhne-Vazhskoye Rural Settlement, Verkhovazhsky District, Vologda Oblast, Russia. The population was 16 as of 2002.

Geography 
The distance to Verkhovazhye is 6.7 km, to Kukolovskaya is 5.4 km. Frolovskaya, Klykovo, Filinskaya are the nearest rural localities.

References 

Rural localities in Verkhovazhsky District